The Angel Hotel is a grade II* listed hotel in Chippenham, Wiltshire, England.

There was an inn called the Bull on this site, on the west side of the town's market place, in 1613; by 1747 it was known as the Angel. The buildings were remodelled and refronted in the early 18th century when the inn expanded into the adjacent house; the frontage has seven bays and three storeys.

References

External links 

Hotels in Wiltshire
Chippenham
Grade II* listed hotels
Grade II* listed buildings in Wiltshire
Former pubs in England